Katalin Benkő (born 12 May 1941) is a Hungarian sprint canoeist who competed in the mid to late 1960s. She won a bronze medal in the K-2 500 m event at the 1966 ICF Canoe Sprint World Championships in East Berlin.

Benkö also finished seventh in the K-2 500 m event at the 1964 Summer Olympics in Tokyo.

References

Sports-reference.com profile

1941 births
Canoeists at the 1964 Summer Olympics
Hungarian female canoeists
Living people
Olympic canoeists of Hungary
ICF Canoe Sprint World Championships medalists in kayak